Little Hell may refer to:

 Little Hell (band), a rock band formed in 2001 by Steve Ludwin 
 Little Hell (album), a 2011 album by City and Colour
 Little Hell, Virginia, an unincorporated community in Accomack County, Virginia
 Little Hell, Delaware, an unincorporated community in Kent County, Delaware
 El Infiernito, Colombia, Spanish for "Little Hell", a pre-Columbian Muisca site

See also
 Little Hells, a 2009 album by Marissa Nadler